USS LST-446 was a United States Navy  used in the Asiatic-Pacific Theater during World War II.

Construction
LST-446 was laid down on 15 June 1942, under Maritime Commission (MARCOM) contract, MC hull 966, by  Kaiser Shipyards, Vancouver, Washington; launched on 18 September 1942; and commissioned on 30 November 1942.

Service history
During the war, LST-446 was assigned to the Pacific Theater of Operations. She took part in the consolidation of the southern Solomons from March through April 1943; the New Georgia Campaign which included the New Georgia-Rendova-Vangunu occupation in July and August 1943, and the Vella Lavella occupation in August 1943; the occupation and defense of Cape Torokina November and December 1943; the Green Islands landing February 1944; the assault and occupation of Guam  July 1944; and the assault and occupation of Okinawa Gunto April 1945.

Post-war service
Following the war, LST-446 performed occupation duty in the Far East until mid-December 1945. Upon her return to the United States, the tank landing ship was decommissioned on 13 July 1946, and struck from the Navy list on 8 October 1946. On 10 February 1947, she was sold to the Suwannee Fruit & Steamship Co., of Jacksonville, Florida, for conversion to merchant service.

Honors and awards
LST-446 earned six battle stars for her World War II service.

Notes 

Citations

Bibliography 

Online resources

External links

 

LST-1-class tank landing ships
World War II amphibious warfare vessels of the United States
1942 ships
S3-M2-K2 ships
Ships built in Vancouver, Washington